Horror is a film genre that seeks to elicit fear or disgust in its audience for entertainment purposes.

Horror films often explore dark subject matter and may deal with transgressive topics or themes. Broad elements include monsters, apocalyptic events, and religious or folk beliefs. Cinematic techniques used in horror films have been shown to provoke psychological reactions in an audience.

Horror films have existed for more than a century. Early inspirations from before the development of film include folklore, religious beliefs and superstitions of different cultures, and the Gothic and horror literature of authors such as Edgar Allan Poe, Bram Stoker, and Mary Shelley. From origins in silent films and German Expressionism, horror only became a codified genre after the release of Dracula (1931). Many sub-genres emerged in subsequent decades, including body horror, comedy horror, slasher films, supernatural horror and psychological horror. The genre has been produced worldwide, varying in content and style between regions. Horror is particularly prominent in the cinema of Japan, Korea, Italy and Thailand, among other countries.

Despite being the subject of social and legal controversy due to their subject matter, some horror films and franchises have seen major commercial success, influenced society and spawned several popular culture icons.

Characteristics 
The Dictionary of Film Studies defines the horror film as representing "disturbing and dark subject matter, seeking to elicit responses of fear, terror, disgust, shock, suspense, and, of course, horror from their viewers." In the chapter "The American Nightmare: Horror in the 70s" from Hollywood from Vietnam to Reagan (2002), film critic Robin Wood declared that commonality between horror films are that "normality is threatened by the monster." This was further expanded upon by The Philosophy of Horror, or Parodoxes of the Heart by Noël Carroll who added that "repulsion must be pleasurable, as evidenced by the genre's popularity."

Prior to the release of Dracula (1931), historian Gary Don Rhodes explained that the idea and terminology of horror film did not exist yet as a codified genre, although critics used the term "horror" to describe films in reviews prior to Draculas release. "Horror" was a term used to describe a variety of meanings. In 1913, Moving Picture World defined "horrors" as showcasing "striped convicts, murderous Indians, grinning 'black-handers', homicidal drunkards" Some titles that suggest horror such as The Hand of Horror (1914) was a melodrama about a thief who steals from his own sister. During the silent era, the term horror was used to describe everything from "battle scenes" in war films to tales of drug addiction. Rhodes concluded that the term "horror film" or "horror movie" was not used in early cinema.

The mystery film genre was in vogue and early information on Dracula being promoted as mystery film was common, despite the novel, play and film's story relying on the supernatural. Newman discussed the genre in British Film Institute's Companion to Horror where he noted that Horror films in the 1930s were easy to identify, but following that decade "the more blurred distinctions become, and horror becomes less like a discrete genre than an effect which can be deployed within any number of narrative settings or narratives patterns".

Various writings on genre from Altman, Lawrence Alloway (Violent America: The Movies 1946-1964 (1971)) and Peter Hutchings (Approaches to Popular Film (1995)) implied it easier to view films as cycles opposed to genres, suggesting the slasher film viewed as a cycle would place it in terms of how the film industry was economically and production wise, the personnel involved in their respective eras, and how the films were marketed exhibited and distributed.
Mark Jancovich in an essay declared that "there is no simple 'collective belief' as to what constitutes the horror genre" between both fans and critics of the genre. Jancovich found that disagreements existed from audiences who wanted to distinguish themselves. This ranged from fans of different genres who may view a film like Alien (1979) as belonging to science fiction, and horror fan bases dismissing it as being inauthentic to either genre. Further debates exist among fans of the genre with personal definitions of "true" horror films, such as fans who embrace cult figures like Freddy Kruger of the A Nightmare on Elm Street series, while others disassociate themselves from characters and series and focusing on genre auteur directors like Dario Argento, while others fans would deem Argento's films as too mainstream, having preferences more underground films. Andrew Tudor wrote in Monsters and Mad Scientists: A Cultural History of the Horror Movie suggested that "Genre is what we collectively believe it to be"

Cinematic techniques 

In a study by Jacob Shelton, the many ways that audience members are manipulated through horror films was investigated in detail. Negative space is one such method that can play a part in inducing a reaction, causing one's eyes to remotely rest on anything in the frame – a wall, or the empty black void in the shadows.

The jump scare is a horror film trope, where an abrupt change in image accompanied with a loud sound intends to surprise the viewer. This can also be subverted to create tension, where an audience may feel more unease and discomfort by anticipating a jump scare.

Mirrors are often used in horror films is to create visual depth and build tension. Shelton argues mirrors have been used so frequently in horror films that audiences have been conditioned to fear them, and subverting audience expectations of a jump scare in a mirror can further build tension. Tight framing and close-ups are also commonly used; these can build tension and induce anxiety by not allowing the viewer to see beyond what is around the protagonist.

Music 

Music is a key component of horror films. In Music in the Horror Film (2010), Lerner writes "music in horror film frequently makes us feel threatened and uncomfortable" and intends to intensify the atmosphere created in imagery and themes. Dissonance, atonality and experiments with timbre are typical characteristics used by composers in horror film music.

Themes 

In the book Dark Dreams, author Charles Derry conceived horror films as focusing on three broad themes: the horror of personality, horror of Armageddon and the horror of the demonic. The horror of personality derives from monsters being at the centre of the plot, such Frankenstein's monster whose psychology makes them perform unspeakable horrific acts ranging from rapes, mutilations and sadistic killings. Other key works of this form are Alfred Hitchcock's Psycho, which feature psychotic murderers without the make-up of a monster. The second 'Armageddon' group delves on the fear of large-scale destruction, which ranges from science fiction works but also of natural events, such as Hitchcock's The Birds (1963). The last group of the "Fear of the Demonic" features graphic accounts of satanic rites, witchcraft, exorcisms outside traditional forms of worship, as seen in films like The Exorcist (1973) or The Omen (1976).

Some critics have suggested horror films can be a vessel for exploring contemporary cultural, political and social trends. Jeanne Hall, a film theorist, agrees with the use of horror films in easing the process of understanding issues by making use of their optical elements. The use of horror films can help audiences understand international prior historical events occurs, for example, to depict the horrors of the Vietnam War, the Holocaust, the worldwide AIDS epidemic or post-9/11 pessimism. In many occurrences, the manipulation of horror presents cultural definitions that are not accurate, yet set an example to which a person relates to that specific cultural from then on in their life.

History 

In his book Caligari's Children: The Film as Tale of Terror (1980), author Siegbert Solomon Prawer stated that those wanting to read into horror films in a linear historical path, citing historians and critics like Carlos Clarens noting that as some film audiences at a time took films made by Tod Browning that starred Bela Lugosi with utmost seriousness, other productions from other countries saw the material set for parody, as children's entertainment or nostalgic recollection. John Kenneth Muir in his books covering the history of horror films through the later decades of the 20th century echoed this statement, stating that horror films mirror the anxieties of "their age and their audience" concluding that "if horror isn't relevant to everyday life... it isn't horrifying".

Early influences and films
Beliefs in the supernatural, devils and ghosts have existed in folklore and religions of many cultures for centuries; these would go on to become integral parts of the horror genre. Zombies, for example, originated from Haitian folklore. Prior to the development of film in the late 1890s, Gothic fiction was developed. These included Frankenstein (1818) and short stories by Edgar Allan Poe, which would later have several film adaptations. By the late 1800s and early 1900s, more key horror texts would be developed than any other period preceding it. While they were not all straight horror stories, the horrific elements of them lingered in popular culture, with their set pieces becoming staples in horror cinema.

Critic and author Kim Newman described Georges Méliès Le Manoir du diable as the first horror film, featuring elements that would become staples in the genre: images of demons, ghosts, and haunted castles.
The early 20th century cinema had production of film so hectic, several adaptions of stories were made within months of each other. This included Poe adaptations made in France and the United States, to Frankenstein adaptations being made in the United States and Italy. The most adapted of these stories was Strange Case of Dr Jekyll and Mr Hyde (1886), which had three version made in 1920 alone.

Early German cinema involved Poe-like stories, such as The Student of Prague (1913) which featured director and actor Paul Wegener. Wegner would go on to work in similar features such as The Golem and the Dancing Girl and its related Golem films. Other actors of the era who featured in similar films included Werner Krauss and Conrad Veidt who starred in The Cabinet of Dr. Caligari, leading to similar roles in other German productions. F. W. Murnau would also direct an adaptation of Nosferatu (1922), a film Newman described as standing "as the only screen adaptation of Dracula to be primarily interested in horror, from the character's rat-like features and thin body, the film was, even more so than Caligari, "a template for the horror film."

1930s 

Following the 1927 success of Broadway play of Dracula, Universal Studios officially purchased the rights to both the play and the novel. After the Draculas premiere on February 12, 1931, the film received what authors of the book Universal Horrors proclaimed as  "uniformly positive, some even laudatory" reviews. The commercial reception surprised Universal who forged ahead to make similar production of Frankenstein (1931). Frankenstein also proved to be a hit for Universal which led to both Dracula and Frankenstein making film stars of their leads: Bela Lugosi and Boris Karloff respectively. Karloff starred in Universal's follow-up The Mummy (1932), which Newman described as the studio knowing "what they were getting" patterning the film close to the plot of Dracula. Lugosi and Karloff would star together in several Poe-adaptations in the 1930s.

Following the release of Dracula, The Washington Post declared the film's box office success led to a cycle of similar films while The New York Times stated in a 1936 overview that Dracula and the arrival of sound film began the "real triumph of these spectral thrillers". Other studios began developing their own horror projects with Metro-Goldwyn-Mayer, Paramount Pictures, and Warner Bros. Universal would also follow-up with several horror films until the mid-1930s.

In 1935, the President of the BBFC Edward Shortt, wrote "although a separate category has been established for these [horrific] films, I am sorry to learn they are on the increase...I hope that the producers and renters will accept this word of warning, and discourage this type of subject as far as possible." As the United Kingdom was a significant market for Hollywood, American producers listened to Shortt's warning, and the number of Hollywood produced horror films decreased in 1936. A trade paper Variety reported that Universal Studios abandonment of horror films after the release of Dracula's Daughter (1936) was that "European countries, especially England are prejudiced against this type product ." At the end of the decade, a profitable re-release of Dracula and Frankenstein would encourage Universal to produce Son of Frankenstein (1939) featuring both Lugosi and Karloff, starting off a resurgence of the horror film that would continue into the mid-1940s.

1940s

After the success of Son of Frankenstein (1939), Universal's horror films received what author Rick Worland of The Horror Film called "a second wind" and horror films continued to be produced at a feverish pace into the mid-1940s. Universal looked into their 1930s horror properties to develop new follow-ups such as their The Invisible Man  and The Mummy series. Universal saw potential in making actor Lon Chaney, Jr. a new star to replace Karloff as Chaney had not distinguished himself in either A or B pictures. Chaney, Jr. would become a horror star for the decade showing in the films in The Wolf Man series, portraying several of Universal's monster characters. B-Picture studios also developed films that imitated the style of Universal's horror output. Karloff worked with Columbia Pictures acting in various films as a "Mad doctor"-type characters starting with The Man They Could Not Hang (1939) while Lugosi worked between Universal and  poverty row studios such as Producers Releasing Corporation (PRC) for The Devil Bat (1941) and Monogram for nine features films.

In March 1942, producer Val Lewton ended his working relationship with independent producer David O. Selznick to work for RKO Radio Pictures' Charles Koerner, becoming the head of a new unit created to develop B-movie horror feature films. According to screenwriter DeWitt Bodeen and director Jacques Tourneur, Lewton's first horror production Cat People (1942), Lewton wanted to make some different from the Universal horror with Tourneu describing it as making "something intelligent and in good taste". Lewton developed a series of horror films for RKO, described by Newman as  "polished, doom-haunted, poetic" while film critic Roger Ebert  the films Lewton produced in the 1940s were "landmark[s] in American movie history". Several horror films of the 1940s borrowed from Cat People, specifically feature a female character who fears that she has inherited the tendency to turn into a monster or attempt to replicate the shadowy visual style of the film. Between 1947 and 1951, Hollywood made almost no new horror films. This was due to sharply declining sales, leading to both major and poverty row studios to re-release their older horror films during this period rather than make new ones.

1950s 
The early 1950s featured only a few gothic horror films developed, prior to the release of Hammer Film Productions's gothic films, Hammer originally began developing American-styled science fiction films in the early 1950s but later branched into horror with their colour films The Curse of Frankenstein and Dracula (1958). These films would birth two horror film stars: Christopher Lee and Peter Cushing and led to further horror film production from Hammer in the decade.

Among the most influential horror films of the 1950s was The Thing From Another World (1951), with Newman stating that countless science fiction horror films of the 1950s would follow in its style. For five years following the release of The Thing From Another World, nearly every film involving aliens, dinosaurs or radioactive mutants would be dealt with matter-of-fact characters as seen in the film. Films featuring vampires, werewolves, and Frankenstein's monster also took to having science fiction elements of the era such as have characters have similar plot elements from Strange Case of Dr Jekyll and Mr Hyde. Horror films also expanded further into international productions in the later half of the 1950s, with films in the genre being made in Mexico, Italy, Germany and France.

1960s 
The horror film changed dramatically in 1960, specifically, with Alfred Hitchcock's film Psycho (1960) based on the novel by Robert Bloch. Newman declared that the film elevated the idea of a multiple-personality serial killer that set the tone future film that was only touched upon in earlier melodramas and film noirs. The release of Psycho led to similar pictures about the psychosis of characters and a brief reappearance of what Newman described as "stately, tasteful" horror films such as Jack Clayton's The Innocents (1961) and Robert Wise's The Haunting (1963). Newman described Roman Polanski's Rosemary's Baby (1968) the other "event" horror film of the 1960s after Psycho.

Roger Corman working with AIP to make House of Usher (1960), which led several future Poe-adaptations other 1960s Poe-adaptations by Corman, and provided roles for aging horror stars such as Karloff and Chaney, Jr.  These films were made to compete with the British colour horror films from Hammer in the United Kingdom featuring their horror stars Cushing and Fisher, whose Frankenstein series continued from 1958 to 1973 Competition for Hammer appeared in the mid-1960s in the United Kingdom with Amicus Productions who also made feature film featuring Cushing and Lee. Like Psycho, Amicus drew from contemporary sources such as Bloch (The Skull (1965) and Torture Garden (1967))  led to Hammer adapting works by more authors from the era.

Mario Bava's Black Sunday (1960) marked an increase in onscreen violence in film. Earlier British horror films had their gorier scenes cut on initial release or suggested through narration while Psycho suggested its violence through fast editing. Black Sunday, by contrast, depicted violence without suggestion. This level of violence would later be seen in other works of Bava and other Italian films such the giallo of Dario Argento and Lucio Fulci. Other independent American productions of the 1960s expanded on the gore shown in the films in a genre later described as the splatter film, with films by Herschell Gordon Lewis such as Blood Feast, while Newman found that the true breakthrough of these independent films was George A. Romero's Night of the Living Dead (1968) which set a new attitudes for the horror film, one that was suspicious of authority figures, broke taboos of society and was satirical between its more suspenseful set pieces.

1970s 

Historian John Kenneth Muir described the 1970s as a "truly eclectic time" for horror cinema, noting a mixture of fresh and more personal efforts on film while other were a resurrection of older characters that have appeared since the 1930s and 1940s. Night of the Living Dead had what Newman described as a "slow burning influence" on horror films of the era and what he described as "the first of the genre auteurs" who worked outside studio settings. These included American directors such as John Carpenter, Tobe Hooper, Wes Craven and Brian De Palma as well as directors working outside America such as Bob Clark, David Cronenberg and Dario Argento. Prior to Night of the Living Dead, the monsters of horror films could easily be banished or defeated by the end of the film, while Romero's film and the films of other filmmakers would often suggest other horror still lingered after the credits.

Both Amicus and Hammer ceased feature film production in the 1970s. Remakes of proved to be popular choices for horror films in the 1970s, with films like Invasion of the Bodysnatchers (1978) and tales based on Dracula which continued into the late 1970s with John Badham's Dracula (1979) and Werner Herzog's Nosferatu the Vampyre (1979). Although not an official remake, the last high-grossing horror film of decade, Alien (1979)  took b-movie elements from films like It! The Terror from Beyond Space (1958).  Newman has suggested high grossing films like Alien, Jaws (1975) and Halloween (1978) became hits by being "relentless suspense machines with high visual sophistication." He continued that Jaws memorable music theme and its monster not being product of society like Norman Bates in Psycho had carried over into Halloweens Michael Myers and its films theme music.

1980s
With the appearance of home video in the 1980s, horror films were subject to censorship in the United Kingdom in a phenomenon popularly known as "video nasties", leading to video collections being seized by police and some people being jailed for selling or owning some horror films. Newman described the response to the video nasty issue led to horror films becoming "dumber than the previous decade" and although films were not less gory, they were "more lightweight [...] becoming more disposable, less personal works." Newman noted that these directors who created original material in the 1970s such as Carpenter, David Cronenberg, and Tobe Hooper would all at least briefly "play it safe" with Stephen King adaptations or remakes of the 1950s horror material.

Replacing Frankenstein's monster and Dracula were new popular characters with more general names like Jason Voorhees (Friday the 13th), Michael Myers (Halloween), and Freddy Kruger (A Nightmare on Elm Street). Unlike the characters of the past who were vampires or created by mad scientists, these characters were seemingly people with common sounding names who developed the slasher film genre of the era. The genre was derided by several contemporary film critics of the era such as Roger Ebert, and often were highly profitable in the box office. The 1980s highlighted several films about body transformation, through special effects and make-up artists like Rob Bottin and Rick Baker who allowed for more detailed and graphic transformation scenes or the human body in various forms of horrific transformation.

Other more traditional styles continued into the 1980s, such as supernatural themed films involving haunted houses, ghosts, and demonic possession. Among the most popular films of the style included Stanley Kubrick's The Shining (1980), Hooper's high-grossing Poltergeist (1982).  After the release of films based on Stephen King's books like The Shining and Carrie led to further film adaptations of his novels throughout the 1980s.

1990s

Horror films of the 1990s also failed to develop as many major new directors of the genre as it had in the 1960s or 1970s. Young independent filmmakers such as Kevin Smith, Richard Linklater, Michael Moore and Quentin Tarantino broke into cinema outside the genre at non-genre festivals like the Sundance Film Festival. Newman noted that the early 1990s was "not a good time for horror", noting excessive release of sequels. Muir commented that in the 1990s after the end of the Cold War, the United States did not really have a "serious enemy" internationally, leading to horror films adapting to fictional enemies predominantly within America, with the American government, large businesses, organized religion and the upper class as well as supernatural and occult items such as vampires or Satanists filling in the horror villains of the 1990s. The rapid growth of technology in the 1990s with the internet and the fears of the Year 2000 problem causing the end of the world were reflected in plots of films.

Other genre-based trends of the 1990s, included the post-modern horror films such as Scream (1996) were made in this era. Post-modern horror films continued into the 2000s, eventually just being released as humorous parody films. By the end of the 1990s, three films were released that Newman described as "cultural phenomenons." These included Hideo Nakata's Ring (1998), which was the major hit across Asia, The Sixth Sense, another ghost story which Newman described as making "an instant cliche" of twist endings, and the low-budget independent film The Blair Witch Project (1999). Newman described the first trend of horror films in the 2000s followed the success of The Blair Witch Project, but predominantly parodies or similar low-budget imitations.

2000s 
Teen oriented series began in the era with Final Destination while the success of the 1999 remake of William Castle's House on Haunted Hill led to a series of remakes in the decade. The popularity of the remake of Dawn of the Dead (2004) led to a revival in American zombie films in the late 2000s. Beyond remakes, other long-dormant horror franchises such as The Exorcist and Friday the 13th received new feature films. After the success of Ring (1998), several films came from Hong Kong, South Korea, Thailand, and Japan with similar detective plotlines investigating ghosts. This trend was echoed in the West with films with similar plots and Hollywood remakes of Asian films like The Ring (2002). In the United Kingdom, there was what Newman described as a "modest revival" of British horror films, first with war-related horror films and several independent films of various styles, with Newman describing the "breakouts of the new British horror" including 28 Days Later (2002) and Shaun of the Dead (2004).

David Edelstein of The New York Times coined a term for a genre he described as "torture porn" in a 2006 article, as a label for films described, often retroactively, to over 40 films since 2003. Edelstein lumped in films such as Saw (2004) and Wolf Creek (2005) under this banner suggesting audience a "titillating and shocking" while film scholars of early 21st century horror films described them as "intense bodily acts and visible bodily representations" to produce uneasy reactions. Kevin Wetmore, using the Saw film series suggested these film suggested reflected a post-9/11 attitude towards increasing pessimism, specifically one of "no redemption, no hope, no expectations that 'we're going to be OK'"

2010s to present
After the film studio Blumhouse had success with Paranormal Activity (2007), the studio continued to produce films became hits in the 2010s with film series Insidious. This led to what Newman described as the companies policy on "commercial savvy with thematic risk that has often paid off", such as Get Out (2017) and series like The Purge. Laura Bradley in her article for Vanity Fair noted that both large and small film studios began noticing Blumhouse's success, including A24, which became popular with films like The Witch (2015) and Midsommar (2019). Bradley commented how some of these films had been classified as "elevated horror", a term used for works that were 'elevated' beyond traditional or pure genre films, but declared "horror aficionados and some critics pushed back against the notion that these films are doing something entirely new" noting their roots in films like Night of the Living Dead (1968) and Rosemary's Baby (1968). The increase in use of streaming services in the 2010s has also been suggested as boosting the popularity of horror; as well as Netflix and Amazon Prime Video producing and distributing numerous works in the genre, Shudder launched in 2015 as a horror-specific service. In the early 2010s, a wave of horror films began exhibiting what Virginie Sélavy described as psychedelic tendency. This was inspired by experimentation and subgenres of the 1970s, specifically folk horror. The trend began with Enter the Void (2009) and Beyond the Black Rainbow (2010) and continued throughout the decade with films like Climax (2018).

Adapted from the Stephen King novel, It (2017) set a box office record for horror films by grossing $123.1 million on opening weekend in the United States and nearly $185 million globally. The success of It led to further King novels being adapted into new feature films. The beginning of 2020 and the COVID-19 pandemic had a major impact on the film industry, leading to several horror films being held back from release, or having their production halted. During lockdowns, streaming for films featuring a fictional apocalypse increased.

Sub-genres of horror films
Horror is a malleable genre and often can be altered to accommodate other genre types such as science fiction, making some films difficult to categorize.

Body horror

A genre that emerged in the 1970s, body horror films focus on the process of a bodily transformation. In these films, the body is either engulfed by some larger process or heading towards fragmentation and collapse. In these films, the focus can be on apocalyptic implication of an entire society being overtaken, but the focus is generally upon an individual and their sense of identity, primarily them watching their own body change. The earliest appearance of the sub-genre was the work of director David Cronenberg, specifically with early films like Shivers (1975). Mark Jancovich of the University of Manchester declared that the transformation scenes in the genre provoke fear and repulsion, but also pleasure and excitement such as in The Thing (1982) and The Fly (1986).

Comedy horror
Comedy horror combines elements of comedy and horror film. The comedy horror genre often crosses over with the black comedy genre. It occasionally includes horror films with lower ratings that are aimed at a family audience. The short story The Legend of Sleepy Hollow by Washington Irving is cited as "the first great comedy-horror story".

Folk horror 
Folk horror uses elements of folklore or other religious and cultural beliefs to instil fear in audiences. Folk horror films have featured rural settings and themes of isolation, religion and nature. Frequently cited examples are Witchfinder General (1968), The Blood on Satan's Claw (1971), The Wicker Man (1973) and Midsommar (2019). Local folklore and beliefs have been noted as being prevalent in horror films from the Southeast Asia region, including Thailand and Indonesia.

Found footage horror

The found footage horror film "technique" gives the audience a first person view of the events on screen, and presents the footage as being discovered after. Horror films which are framed as being made up of "found-footage" merge the experiences of the audience and characters, which may induce suspense, shock, and bafflement. Alexandra Heller-Nicholas noted that the popularity of sites like YouTube in 2006 sparked a taste for amateur media, leading to the production of further films in the found footage horror genre later in the 2000s including the particularly financially successful Paranormal Activity (2007).

Gothic horror

In their book Gothic film, Richard J. McRoy and Richard J. Hand stated that "Gothic" can be argued as a very loose subgenre of horror, but argued that "Gothic" as a whole was a style like film noir and not bound to certain cinematic elements like the Western or science fiction film.  The term "gothic" is frequently used to describe a stylized approach to showcasing location, desire, and action in film. Contemporary views of the genre associate it with imagery of castles at hilltops and labyrinth like ancestral mansions that are in various states of disrepair. Narratives in these films often focus on an audiences fear and attraction to social change and rebellion.  The genre can be applied to films as early as The Haunted Castle (1896), Frankenstein (1910) as well as to more complex iterations such as Park Chan-wook's Stoker (2013) and Jordan Peele's Get Out (2017).

The gothic style is applied to several films throughout the history of the horror film. This includes Universal Pictures' horror films of the 1930s, the revival of gothic horror in the 1950s and 1960s with films from Hammer, Roger Corman's Poe-cycle, and several Italian productions. By the 1970s American and British productions often had vampire films set in a contemporary setting, such as Hammer Films had their Dracula stories set in a modern setting and made other horror material which pushed the erotic content of their vampire films that was initiated by Black Sunday. In the 1980s, the older horror characters of Dracula and Frankenstein's monster rarely appeared, with vampire themed films continued often in the tradition of authors like Anne Rice where vampirism becomes a lifestyle choice rather than plague or curse. Following the release of Francis Ford Coppola's Bram Stoker's Dracula (1992), a small wave of high-budgeted gothic horror romance films were released in the 1990s.

Natural horror

Also described as "eco-horror", the natural horror film is a subgenre "featuring nature running amok in the form of mutated beasts, carnivorous insects, and normally harmless animals or plants turned into cold-blooded killers." In 1963, Hitchcock defined a new genre nature taking revenge on humanity with The Birds (1963) that was expanded into a trend into the 1970s. Following the success of Willard (1971), a film about killer rats, 1972 had similar films with Stanley (1972) and an official sequel Ben (1972). Other films followed in suit such as Night of the Lepus (1972),  Frogs (1972), Bug (1975), Squirm (1976) and what Muir described as the "turning point" in the genre with Jaws (1975), which became the highest-grossing film at that point and moved the animal attacks genres "towards a less-fantastic route" with less giant animals and more real-life creatures such as Grizzly (1976) and Night Creature (1977), Orca (1977), and Jaws 2 (1978). The film is linked with the environmental movements that became more mainstream in the 1970s and early 1980s such vegetarianism, animal rights movements, and organizations such as Greenpeace. Following Jaws, sharks became the most popular animal of the genre, ranging from similar such as Mako: The Jaws of Death (1976) and Great White (1981) to the Sharknado film series. James Marriott found that the genre had "lost momentum" since the 1970s while the films would still be made towards the turn of the millennium.

Slasher film 

The slasher film is a horror subgenre, which involving a killer murdering a group of people (usually teenagers), usually by use of bladed tools. In his book on the genre, author Adam Rockoff that these villains represented a "rogue genre" of films with "tough, problematic, and fiercely individualistic." Following the financial success of Friday the 13th (1980), at least 20 other slasher films appeared in 1980 alone. These films usually revolved around five properties: unique social settings (campgrounds, schools, holidays) and a crime from the past committed (an accidental drowning, infidelity, a scorned lover) and a ready made group of victims (camp counselors, students, wedding parties). The genre was derided by several contemporary film critics of the era such as Ebert, and often were highly profitable in the box office. The release of Scream (1996), led to a brief revival of the slasher films for the 1990s. Other countries imitated the American slasher film revival, such as South Korea's early 2000s cycle with Bloody Beach (2000), Nightmare (2000) and The Record (2000).

Supernatural horror 
Supernatural horror films integrate supernatural elements, such as the afterlife, spirit possession and religion into the horror genre.

Teen horror 
Teen horror is a horror subgenre that victimizes teenagers while usually promoting strong, anti-conformity teenage leads, appealing to young generations. This subgenre often depicts themes of sex, under-aged drinking, and gore. Horror films aimed a young audience featuring teenage monsters grew popular in the 1950s with several productions from American International Pictures (AIP) and productions of Herman Cohen with I Was a Teenage Werewolf (1957) and I Was a Teenage Frankenstein (1957). This led to later productions like Daughter of Dr. Jekyll (1957) and Frankenstein's Daughter (1958). Teen horror cycle in the 1980s often showcased explicit gore and nudity, with John Kenneth Muir described as cautionary conservative tales where most of the films stated if you partook in such vices such as drugs or sex, your punishment of death would be handed out.
Prior to Scream, there were no popular teen horror films in the early 1990s. After the financial success of Scream, teen horror films became increasingly reflexive and self-aware until the end of the 1990s with films like I Know What You Did Last Summer (1997) and non-slasher The Faculty (1998). The genre lost prominence as teen films dealt with threats with more realism in films like Donnie Darko (2001) and Crazy/Beautiful (2001). In her book on the 1990s teen horror cycle, Alexandra West described the general trend of these films is often looked down upon by critics, journals, and fans as being too glossy, trendy, and sleek to be considered worthwhile horror films.

Psychological horror 
Psychological horror is a subgenre of horror and psychological fiction with a particular focus on mental, emotional, and psychological states to frighten, disturb, or unsettle its audience. The subgenre frequently overlaps with the related subgenre of psychological thriller, and often uses mystery elements and characters with unstable, unreliable, or disturbed psychological states to enhance the suspense, drama, action, and paranoia of the setting and plot and to provide an overall unpleasant, unsettling, or distressing atmosphere.

Regional horror films

Asian horror films
Horror films in Asia have been noted as being inspired by national, cultural or religious folklore, particularly beliefs in ghosts or spirits. In Asian Horror, Andy Richards writes that there is a "widespread and engrained acceptance of supernatural forces" in many Asian cultures, and suggests this is related to animist, pantheist and karmic religious traditions, as in Buddhism and Shintoism. Although Chinese, Japanese, Thai and Korean horror has arguably received the most international attention, horror also makes up a considerable proportion of Cambodian and Malaysian cinema.

India 

The Cinema of India produces the largest amount of films in the world, ranging from Bollywood (Hindi cinema based in Mumbai) to other regions such as West Bengal and Tamil Nadu. Unlike Hollywood and most Western cinematic traditions, horror films produced in India incorporate romance, song-and-dance, and other elements in the "masala" format, where as many genres as possible are bundled into a single film. Odell and Le Blanc described the Indian horror film as "a popular, but minor part of the country's film output" and that "has not found a true niche in mainstream Indian cinema." These films are made outside of Mumbai, and are generally seen as disreputable to their more respectable popular cinema. As of 2007, the Central Board of Film Certification, India's censorship board has stated films "pointless or unavoidable scenes of violence, cruelty and horror, scenes of violence intended to provide entertainment and such scene that may have the effect of desensitising or dehumanizing people are not shown."

The earliest Indian horror films were films about ghosts and reincarnation or rebirth such as Mahal (1949). These early films tended to be spiritual pieces or tragic dramas opposed to having visceral content. While prestige films from Hollywood productions had been shown in Indian theatres, the late 1960s had seen a parallel market for minor American and European co-productions to films like the James Bond film series and the films of Mario Bava. In the 1970s and 1980s, the Ramsay Brothers created a career in the lower reaches of the Bombay film industry making low-budget horror films, primarily influenced by Hammer's horror film productions, with little known about their production or distribution history.  The Ramsay Brothers were a family of seven brothers who made horror films that were featured monsters and evil spirits that mix in song and dance sections as well as comic interludes. Most of their films played at smaller cinema in India, with Tulsi Ramsay, one of the brothers, later stating "Places where even the trains don't stop, that's where our business was." Their horror films are generally dominated by low-budget productions, such as those by the Ramsay Brothers. Their most successful film was Purana Mandir (1984), which was the second highest-grossing film in India that year. The influence of American productions would have an effect on later Indian productions such as The Exorcist which would lead to films involving demonic possession such as Gehrayee (1980). India has also made films featuring zombies and vampires that drew from American horror films opposed to indigenous myths and stories. Other directors, such as Mohan Bhakri made low budget highly exploitive films such as Cheekh (1985) and his biggest hit, the monster movie Khooni Mahal (1987).

Horror films are not self-evident categories in Tamil and Telugu films and it was only until the late 1980s that straight horror cinema was regularly produced with films like Uruvam (1991), Sivi (2007), and Eeram (2009) were released. The first decade of the twenty-first century saw a flurry of commercially successful Telugu horror films like A Film by Aravind (2005), Mantra (2007), and Arundhati (2009) were released. Ram Gopal Varma made films that generally defied the conventions of popular Indian cinema, making horror films like Raat (1992) and Bhoot (2003), with the latter film not containing and comic scenes or musical numbers. In 2018, the horror film Tumbbad premiered in the critics' week section of the 75th Venice International Film Festival—the first ever Indian film to open the festival.

Indonesia

Japan 

Some Japanese horror films have inspired American remakes. The visual interpretations of films can be lost in the translation of their elements from one culture to another, like in the adaptation of the Japanese film Ju on into the American film The Grudge. The cultural components from Japan were slowly "siphoned away" to make the film more relatable to a western audience. This deterioration that can occur in an international remake happens by over-presenting negative cultural assumptions that, as time passes, sets a common ideal about that particular culture in each individual. Holm's discussion of The Grudge remakes presents this idea by stating, "It is, instead, to note that The Grudge films make use of an un-theorized notion of Japan... that seek to directly represent the country."

South Korea 

The Korean horror film originated in the 1960s and became a more prominent part of the countries film production in the early 2000s. While ghosts have appeared as early as 1924 in Korean film, attempting to chart the history of the genre from this period was described by Alison Peirse and Daniel Martin, the authors of "Korean Horror Cinema" as "problematic", due to the control of the Japanese colonial government blocking artistic or politically independent films. Regardless of settings or time period, many Korean horror films such as Song of the Dead (1980) have their stories focused on female relationships, rooted in Korean Confucianism tradition with an emphasis on biological families. Despite the influence of folklore in some films, there is no key single canon to define the Korean horror film. Korean horror cinema is also defined by melodrama, as it does in most of Korean cinema.

The Housemaid (1960) is widely credited as initiating the first horror cycle in Korean cinema, which involved films of the 1960s about supernatural revenge tales, focused on cruelly murdered women who sought out revenge. Several of these films are in dept to Korean folklore and ghost stories, with stories of animal transformation. Traces of international cinema are found in early Korean horror cinema. such as Shin Sang-ok's Madame White Snake (1960) from the traditional Chinese folktale Legend of the White Snake. Despite bans of Japanese cultural products that lasted from 1945 to 1998,  the influence of Japanese culture are still found in Kaibyō eiga (ghost cats) themed films, such as A Devilish Homicide (1965) and Ghosts of Chosun (1970).  Other 1960s films featured narratives involving kumiho such as The Thousand Year Old Fox (Cheonnyeonho) (1969). These tales based on folklore and ghosts continued into the 1970s. Korea also produced giant monster films that received release in the United States such as Yongary, Monster from the Deep (1967) and Ape (1976).

By the end of the 1970s, the Korean horror film entered a period known commonly as the "dark time" for South Korean cinema with audience attracted to Hong Kong and American imports. The biggest influence on this was the "3S" policy adopted by the Chun Doo-hwan government which promoted the production of "sports, screen and sex" for the film industry leading to more relaxed censorship leading to a boom in Erotic Korean films. Horror films followed this trend with Suddenly at Midnight (1981), a reimagining of The Housemaid (1960). As of 2013, many pre-1990 Korean horror films are only available through the Korean Film Archive (KOFA) in Seoul. It was not until the 1998 release of Whispering Corridors was the Korean horror film reinvigorated, with its style containing traces of traditional Korean cinema (culturally specific themes and melodrama) but also the American pattern of making a franchise of horror films, as the film received four sequels. Since the film's release, Korean horror films had had strong diversity with gothic tales like A Tale of Two Sisters (2003), gory horror films like Bloody Reunion (2006), horror comedy (To Catch a Virgin Ghost (2004)), vampire films (Thirst (2009)), and independent productions (Teenage Hooker Became a Killing Machine (2000)). These films varied in popularity with Ahn Byeong-ki's Phone (2002) reaching the top ten in the domestic box office sales in 2002 while in 2007, no locally produced Korean horror films were financially successful with local audiences.  In 2020, Anton Bitel declared in Sight & Sound that South Korea was one of the international hot spots for horror film production in the last decade, citing the international and popular releases of films like Train to Busan (2016), The Odd Family: Zombie on Sale (2019) Peninsula (2020) and The Wailing (2016).

Thailand

Oceania

Australia 
It is unknown when Australia's cinema first horror title may have been, with thoughts ranging from The Strangler's Grip (1912) to The Face at the Window (1919) while stories featuring ghosts would appear in Guyra Ghost Mystery (1921). By 1913, the more prolific era of Australian cinema ended with production not returning with heavy input of government finance in the 1970s. It took until the 1970s for Australia to develop sound film with television films that eventually received theatrical release with Dead Easy (1970) and Night of Fear (1973). The Cars That Ate Paris (1974) was the first Australian horror production made for theatrical release. 1970s Australian art cinema was funded by state film corporations, who considered them more culturally acceptable than local exploitation films (Ozploitation), which was part of the Australian phenomenon called the cultural cringe. The greater success of genre films like Mad Max (1979), The Last Wave (1977) and Patrick (1978) led to the Australian Film Commission to change its focus to being a more commercial operation. This closed in 1980 as its funding was abused by investors using them as tax avoiding measures. A new development known as the 10BA tax shelter scheme was developed ushering a slew of productions, leading to what Peter Shelley, author of Australian Horror Films, suggested meant "making a profit was more important than making a good film." Shelley called these films derivative of "American films and presenting generic American material". These films included the horror film productions of Antony I. Ginnane. While Australia would have success with international films between the mid-1980s and the 2000s, less than 5 horror films were produced in the country between 1993 and 2000. It was only after the success of Wolf Creek (2005) that a new generation of filmmakers would continuously make horror genre films in Australia that continued into the 2010s.

New Zealand 
By 2005, New Zealand has produced around 190 feature films, with about 88% of them being made after 1976. New Zealand horror film history was described by Philip Matthews of Stuff as making "po-faced gothic and now we do horror for laughs." Among the earliest known New Zealand horror films productions are Strange Behavior (1981), a co-production with Australia and Death Warmed Up (1984) a single production.  Early features such as Melanie Read's Trial Run (1984) where a mother is sent to remote cottage to photograph penguins and finds it habitat to haunted spirits, and Gaylene Preston's Mr. Wrong (1984) purchases a car that is haunted by its previous owner. Other films imitate American slasher and splatter films with Bridge to Nowhere (1986),  and the early films of Peter Jackson who combined splatter films with comedy with Bad Taste (1988) and Braindead (1992) which has the largest following of the mentioned films. Film producer Ant Timpson had an influence curating New Zealand horror films,  creating the Incredibly Strange Film Festival in the 1990s and producing his own horror films over the 2010s including The ABCs of Death (2012), Deathgasm (2015), and Housebound (2014). Timpson noted the latter horror entries from New Zealand are all humorous films like What We Do in the Shadows (2014) with Jonathan King, director of Black Sheep (2006) and The Tattooist (2007) stating "I'd love to see a genuinely scary New Zealand film but I don't know if New Zealand audiences – or the funding bodies – are keen."

European horror films
Ian Olney described the horror films of Europe were often more erotic and "just plain stranger" than their British and American counter-parts. European horror films (generally referred to as Euro Horror) draw from distinctly European cultural sources, including surrealism, romanticism, decadent tradition, early 20th century pulp-literature, film serials, and erotic comics. In comparison to the narrative logic in American genre films, these films focused on imagery, excessiveness, and the irrational.

Between the mid-1950s and the mid-1980s, European horror films emerged from counties like Italy, Spain and France and were shown in the United States predominantly at drive-in theatre and grindhouse theatres.
As producers and distributors all over the world were interested in horror films, regardless of their origin changes started occurring in European low-budget filmmaking that allowed for productions in the 1960s and 1970s for horror films from Italy, France, Germany, United Kingdom and Spain, as well as co-productions between these countries. Several productions, such as those in Italy were co-productions due to the lack of international stars within the country. European horror films began developing strong cult following since the late 1990s.

France 

France never truly developed a horror film movement to the volume that the United Kingdom or Italy had produced. In their book European Nightmares, editors Patricia Allmer, Emily Brick, and David Huxley noted that French cinema was generally perceived as having a tradition of the fantastic, rather than horror films. The editors noted that French cinema had produced a series of outstanding individual horror films, from directors who did not specialize in the field. In their book Horror Films, Colin Odell & Michelle Le Blanc referred to director Jean Rollin as one of the countries most consistent horror auteurs with 40 years of productions described as "highly divisive" low budget horror films often featuring erotic elements, vampires, low budgets, pulp stories and references to both high and low European art. Another of the few French directors who specialized in horror is Alexandre Aja, who stated that "the problem with the French is that they don't trust their own language [when it comes to horror]. American horror movies do well, but in their own language, the French just aren't interested."

A 21st-century movement of transgressive French cinema known as New French Extremity was named by film programmer James Quandt in 2004, who declared and derided that films of Catherine Breillat, Claire Denis, Gaspar Noé, and Bruno Dumont, among others, had made "cinema suddenly determined to break every taboo, to wade in rivers of viscera and spumes of sperm, to fill each frame with flesh, nubile, or gnarled, and subject it to all manner of penetration mutilation and defilement." In her book Films of the New French Extremity, Alexandra West described the phenomenon as initially an art house movement, but as the directors of those films started making horror films fitting arthouse standards such as Trouble Every Day (2001) and Marina de Van's In My Skin (2002), other directors began making more what West described as "outright horror films" such as Aja's High Tension (2003) and Xavier Gens' Frontier(s) (2007). Some of these horror films of the New French Extremity movement would regularly place on "Best Of" genre lists, such as Martyrs (2008), Inside (2007) and High Tension (2003) while Julia Ducournau's film Titane (2021) won the Palme d'Or at the 2021 Cannes Film Festival.

Germany

German postwar horror films remained marginal after its success during the silent film era.  The Third Reich ended production of horror films and German productions never gained a mass audience in Germany's horror film output leading the genre to not return in any major form until the late 1960s. Between 1933 and 1989, Randall Halle stated about only 34 films that could be described as horror films and 45 which were co-productions with other countries, primarily Spain and Italy. Outside of Herzog's Nosferatu (1979) most of these films low-budget that focused on erotic themes over horrific turns in narrative. In the mid-1970s, Federal Department for Media Harmful to Young Persons was tasked with protection of minors from violent, racist and pornographic content in literature and comic books which led to increased the code which became law in 1973. These laws expanded to home video in 1985 following the release of titles such as Sam Raimi's The Evil Dead (1981) and the political change when Helmut Kohl became chancellor in 1982. The amount of West German film productions were already low in the 1980s, leaving the genre to be shot by amateurs who had  little to no budgets. In the early 1980s, West Germany's government cracked down on graphic horror films similar to the United Kingdom's Video nasty panic. A direct response to this led to West German independent directors in the late 1980s and early 1990s, West German indie directors to release a comparatively high number of what Kai-Uwe Werbeck described as low-budget "hyper-violent horror films" sometimes described as German underground horror. Werbeck described the most prominent of these were of Jörg Buttgereit, described by Werbeck as "arguably the most visible German horror director of the 1980s and early 1990s", one which Harald Harzheim claimed to be "the first German director since the 1920s to give the horror genre new impulses". Similar gory films such as Olaf Ittenbach's The Burning Moon was the first, and last film to be made in Germany that is still banned there as of 2016.

German horror films made a comeback in what Werbeck described as a mainstream fashion in the 21st century. This included the box office hit Anatomy (2000) and Antibodies (2005), who Odell and Le Blanc described as being a similar to the 1960s krimi genre of crime films.  The second were films made for international markets such as Legion of the Dead (2001) and the video game adaptations directed Uwe Boll such as House of the Dead (2003) and Alone in the Dark (2005).

Italy

Early silent Italian fantastique films focused more on adventure and farce opposed to Germany's expressionism. The National Fascist Party in Italy had forced film in the early sound era to "spread the civilization of Rome throughout the world as quickly as possible." Another influence was the Centro Cattolico Cinematografico (Catholic Cinematic Centre) that was described by Curti as "permissive towards propaganda and repressive against anything related to sexuality or morality." The Vatican City's newspaper L'Osservatore Romano for example, critiqued the circulation of films like Bride of Frankenstein (1935) in 1940.

As Italian neorealism had monopolized Italian cinema in the 1940s, and as the average Italian standard for living increased, Italian critic and historian Gian Piero Brunetta stated that it would "appear legitimate to start exploring the fantastic." Italian film historian Goffredo Fofi echoed these statements, stating in 1963 that "ghosts, monsters and the taste for the horrible appears when a society that became wealthy and evolves by industrializing, and are accompanied by a state of well-being which began to exist and expand in Italy only since a few years" Initially, this was a rise in peplum films after the release of Hercules (1958). Italy started moving beyond peplums making Westerns and horror films which were less expensive to produce than the previous sword-and-sandal films.

Italy's initial wave of horror films were gothic horror were rooted in popular cinema, and were often co-productions with other countries. Curti described the initial wave of the 1960s Italian gothic horror allowed directors like Mario Bava, Riccardo Freda and Antonio Margheriti to helm what Curti described as "some of their very best works." Bava's Black Sunday (1960) was particularly influential. Many productions of this era were often written in a hurry, sometimes developed during filming production by production companies that often did not last very long, sometimes for only one film production. After 1966, the gothic cycle ended, primarily through a broader crisis that effected the Italian film industry with its audience rapidly shrinking. Some gothics continued to be produced into the beginning of the 1970s, while the influence of the genre was felt in other Italian genres like the Spaghetti Western.

The term giallo, which means "yellow" in Italian, is derived from Il Giallo Mondadori, a long-running series of mystery and crime novels identifiable by their distinctive uniform yellow covers, and is used in Italy to describe all mystery and thriller fiction. English-language critics use the term to describe more specific films within the genre, involving a murder mystery that revels in the details of the murder rather than the deduction of it or police procedural elements. Tim Lucas deemed early films in the genre such as Bava's The Girl Who Knew Too Much (1963) while Curti described Blood and Black Lace (1964) as predominantly a series of violent, erotically charged set pieces that are "increasingly elaborate and spectacular" in their construction, and that Bava pushed these elements to the extreme which would solidify the genre.  It was not until the success of Dario Argento's 1970 film The Bird with the Crystal Plumage that the giallo genre started a major trend in Italian cinema.

Other smaller trends permutated in Italy in the 1970s such as films involving cannibals, zombies and Nazis which Newman described as "disreputable crazes". In Italy entered the 1980s, the Italian film industry would gradually move towards making films for television. The decade started with a high-budgeted production of Argento's Inferno (1980) and with the death of Mario Bava, Fulci became what historian Roberto Curti called "Italy's most prominent horror film director in the early 1980s".  Several zombie films were made in the country in the early 80s from Fulci and others while Argento would continue directing and producing films for others such as Lamberto Bava. As Fulci's health deteriorated towards the end of the decade, many directors turned to making horror films for Joe D'Amato's Filmirage company, independent films or works for television and home video.

Spain
The highest point of production of Spanish horror films took place during late Francoism, between 1968 and 1975, a period associated to the so-called Fantaterror, the local expression of Euro Horror, identifiable for its "disproportionate doses of sex and violence". During this period, several Spanish filmmakers appeared with unique styles and themes such as Jesús Franco's The Awful Dr. Orloff (1962),  first internationally successful horror and exploitation film production from Spain. Dr. Orloff would appears in other films of Franco's during the period. Paul Naschy, the actor and screenwriter., and Amando de Ossorio with his zombie like medieval knights in Tombs of the Blind Dead (1972). These directors adapted established monsters from popular films, comics and pulp fiction and imbuing them with what Lazaro-Reboll described as "certain local flavour and relevance." A partial overview of films from this era focused on classic monsters (Frankenstein's Bloody Terror (1968), Dr. Jekyll y el Hombre Lobo (1972)) and films that grew from trends created by Night of the Living Dead and The Exorcist (The Living Dead at the Manchester Morgue (1974), Exorcismo (1975)). Most films of the period were low-budget films with short shooting schedules, while occasional films had respectable budgets such as 99 Women (1969) and others that had art house directors attempt commercial production such as Vicente Aranda's The Blood Spattered Bride and Jorge Grau's Bloody Ceremony (1973) Antonio Lazaro-Reboll wrote in 2012 that in the last forty years, the horror film has formed as a significant part of Spain's local transnational filmic production, that created its own auteurs, stars and cycles. For decades, it was described by Beck and Rodríguez-Ortega in Contemporary Spanish Cinema and Genre that the view of the genre has been "almost exclusively been constructed negatively" and that the rise in horror film productions in the late 1960s and 1970s in Spain was "reviled by contemporary critics, film historians and scholars". In his 1974 book Cine español, cine de subgéneros, author Román Gurbern saw contemporary Spanish horror films as "derivative of Authentic American and European traditions" that will "never make it into the histories of Spanish cinema, unless it is dealt with in a succinct footnote."

Film production decreased dramatically in the late 1970s and 1980s for several reasons, including the boom in historical and political films in Spain during early year of democracy. The film legislation implemented by general director of cinematography Pilar Miró in 1983 introduced a selective subvention system, causing the overall number of annually made films (including horror films) to shrink, thereby dealing a heavy blow to horror industry and the Fantaterror craze. In addition, there were changing habits on audiences and the visual material they sought. It was not until the late 1990s and the 2000s that Spanish horror reached another production peak.

After the success of private television operator Canal+ from the 1990s onward investing in the production of films by the likes of Álex de la Iglesia (The Day of the Beast; 1995) or Alejandro Amenábar (Tesis; 1996 and The Others; 2001) through Sogecine, other television companies such as Antena 3 and Telecinco (through Telecinco Cinema) came to see horror as a profitable niche, and the genre thereby became a successful formula for box-office hits in the 2000s, underpinning the wider switch in the industry from the largely State-dependent model of the 1980s to the hegemony of mass media holdings in domestic film production. Jaume Balagueró's The Nameless (1999), which became a popular film both in Spain and abroad, paved the way for new Spanish horror films. Filmax tried to capitalise on the success of the former film by creating the Fantastic Factory genre label and eventually came to develop one of the most successful Spanish film franchises with the Rec film series. The success of Juan Antonio Bayona's The Orphanage (2007) ensued with the release of ersatz gothic films featuring creepy children. Other key names for the development of the genre in the 21st-century Spanish industry include Juan Carlos Fresnadillo and Paco Plaza.

United Kingdom

Americas

Mexico 

After the 1931 release of a US-produced Spanish-language version of Dracula by George Melford for the Latin-American market employing Mexican actors, Mexican horror films were produced throughout the 1930s and 1940s, often reflecting on the overarching theme of science vs. religion conflict. Ushered by the release of El vampiro, the Mexploitation horror film era started in 1957, with films characterised by their low production values and camp appeal, often featuring vampires, wrestlers, and aztec mummies. A key figure in the Mexican horror scene (particularly in Germán Robles-starred vampire films) was producer Abel Salazar. The late 1960s saw the advent of the prominence of Carlos Enrique Taboada as an standout Mexican horror filmmaker, with films such as Hasta el viento tiene miedo (1967), El libro de piedra (1968), Más negro que la noche (1975) or Veneno para las hadas (1984). Mexican horror cinema has been noted for the mashup of classic gothic and romantic themes and characters with autochthonous features of the Mexican culture such as the Ranchería setting, the colonial past or the myth of La Llorona (shared with other Hispanic-American nations).

Horror has proven to be a dependable genre at the Mexican box office in the 21st-century, with Mexico ranking as having the world's largest relative popularity of the genre among viewers (ahead of South Korea), according to a 2016 research.

Effects on audiences

Psychological effects 

In a study done by Uri Hasson et al., brain waves were observed via functional magnetic resonance imaging (fMRI). This study used the inter-subject correlation analysis (ISC) method of determining results. It was shown that audience members tend to focus on certain facets in a particular scene simultaneously and tend to sit as still as possible while watching horror films.

In another study done by John Greene & Glenn Sparks, it was found that the audience tends to experience the excitation transfer process (ETP) which causes a physiological arousal in audience members. The ETP refers to the feelings experienced immediately after an emotion-arousing experience, such as watching a horror film. In this case, audience members' heart rate, blood pressure and respiration all increased while watching films with violence. Audience members with positive feedback regarding the horror film have feelings similar to happiness or joy felt with friends, but intensified. Alternatively, audience members with negative feedback regarding the film would typically feel emotions they would normally associate with negative experiences in their life.

Only about 10% of the American population enjoy the physiological rush felt immediately after watching horror films. The population that does not enjoy horror films could experience emotional fallout similar to that of PTSD if the environment reminds them of particular scenes.

A 2021 study suggested horror films that explore grief can provide psychological benefits to the bereaved, with the genre well suited to representing grief through its genre conventions.

Physical effects 
In a study by Medes et al., prolonged exposure to infrasound and low-frequency noise (<500 Hz) in long durations has an effect on vocal range (i.e. longer exposure tends to form a lower phonation frequency range). Another study by Baliatsas et al. observed that there is a correlation between exposure to infrasound and low-frequency noises and sleep-related problems. Though most horror films keep the audio around 20–30 Hz, the noise can still be unsettling in long durations.

Another technique used in horror films to provoke a response from the audience is cognitive dissonance, which is when someone experiences tension in themselves and is urged to relieve that tension. Dissonance is the clashing of unpleasant or harsh sounds. A study by Prete et al. identified that the ability to recognize dissonance relied on the left hemisphere of the brain, while consonance relied on the right half. There is a stronger preference for consonance; this difference is noticeable even in early stages of life. Previous musical experience also can influence a dislike for dissonance.

Skin conductance responses (SCRs), heart rate (HR), and electromyographic (EMG) responses vary in response to emotional stimuli, showing higher for negative emotions in what is known as the "negative bias." When applied to dissonant music, HR decreases (as a bodily form of adaptation to harsh stimulation), SCR increases, and EMG responses in the face are higher. The typical reactions go through a two-step process of first orienting to the problem (the slowing of HR), then a defensive process (a stronger increase in SCR and an increase in HR). This initial response can sometimes result in a fight-or-flight response, which is the characteristic of dissonance that horror films rely on to frighten and unsettle viewers.

Reception

In film criticism 

Critic Robin Wood was not the first film critic to take the horror film seriously, but his article Return of the Repressed in 1978 helped inaugurate the horror film into academic study as a genre. Wood later stated that he was surprised that his work, as well as the writing of Richard Lippe and Andrew Britton would receive "historic importance" intellectual views of the film genre. William Paul in his book Laughing Screaming comments that "the negative definition of the lower works would have it that they are less subtle than higher genres. More positively, it could be said that they are more direct. Where lower forms are explicit, higher forms tend to operate more by indirection. Because of this indirection the higher forms are often regarded as being more metaphorical, and consequently more resonant, more open to the exegetical analyses of the academic industry."

Steffen Hantke noted that academic criticism about horror cinema had "always operated under duress" noting that challenges in legitimizing its subject, finding "career-minded academics might have always suspected that they were studying something that was ultimately too frivolous, garish, and sensationalistic to warrant serious critical attention".

Some commentary has suggested that horror films have been underrepresented or underappreciated as serious works worthy of film criticism and major films awards. As of 2021, only six horror films have been nominated for the Academy Award for Best Picture, with The Silence of the Lambs being the sole winner. However, horror films have still won major awards.

Critics have also commented on the representation of women and disability in horror films, as well as the prevalence of racial stereotypes.

Censorship 

Many horror films have been the subject of moral panic, censorship and legal controversy.

In the United Kingdom, film censorship has frequently been applied to horror films. A moral panic over several slasher films in the 1980s led to many of them being banned but released on videotape; the phenomenon became popularly termed "video nasties". Constraints on permitted subject matter in Indonesian films has also influenced Indonesian horror films. In March 2008, China banned all horror films from its market.

In the U.S., the Motion Picture Production Code which was implemented in 1930, set moral guidelines for film content, restraining movies containing controversial themes, graphic violence, explicit sexuality and/or nudity. The gradual abandonment of the Code, and its eventual formal repeal in 1968 (when it was replaced by the MPAA film rating system) offered more freedom to the movie industry.

References

Notes

Bibliography

Further reading 
 Dixon, Wheeler Winston. A History of Horror. (Rutgers University Press; 2010), .
 Steffen Hantke, ed. American Horror Film: The Genre at the Turn of the Millennium (University Press of Mississippi; 2010), 253 pages.
 Petridis, Sotiris (2014). "A Historical Approach to the Slasher Film". Film International 12 (1): 76–84.

External links 

Horror genre on IMDb

Film genres
 

Thrillers
Articles containing video clips